Sven Fornling (born 8 December 1988) is a Swedish professional boxer. He held the IBO light-heavyweight title from 2018 to 2019 and challenged once for the WBA interim light-heavyweight title.

Professional career
Fornling made his professional debut on 8 November 2013, scoring a first-round technical knockout (TKO) victory over Jovo Paskas at the Kalmar Sporthall in Kalmar, Sweden.

Professional boxing record

References

External links

Official website

Living people
1988 births
Swedish male boxers
Sportspeople from Malmö
Light-heavyweight boxers